Kim, Won Kyu (17 October 1945 – 25 September 2013) was a South Korean educator who founded and was the first principal for what is now known as Seoul High School. He is survived by his youngest brother Pablo Jin Kyu Kim and his children.

Work
A tough yet supportive educator, Kim was known as the "Exam Czar" by the general Korean population and credited with Korea's modern entrance exam system by his former students.

References

 Tigers With Wings, Y.S.Kim (1996.5.21)

"Koreans Visit Dean White", Daily Kent Stater, Volume 1, Number 21, 26 October 1954 
"Korean Educator Visits His Prize Pupils at Tech" Pittsburgh Post-Gazette  · Friday, October 22, 1954 · Page 4 

South Korean educators
1945 births
2013 deaths